Terma can refer to:

Terma (religion), traditions of revelation in Tibetan Buddhism, Bön and the Greater Himalayan region
"Terma" (The X-Files), an episode of The X-Files
Terma A/S, a Danish company
Terma Foundation, American charity working in Tibet